The Huntsville Hospital Tram System is an automated people mover system located as part of the Huntsville Hospital System complex in Huntsville, Alabama, United States. Operating on a  concrete guideway, the trams serve to connect the Huntsville Hospital with the Huntsville Hospital for Women & Children. At the time of completion, this was the second hospital people mover system in the United States after the Duke University Medical Center Patient Rapid Transit. , this is the only automated people mover system completed in the state of Alabama.

Description
Developed by Poma-Otis Transportation Systems, a joint venture of Poma and the Otis Elevator Company, and constructed by Brasfield & Gorrie, the cable-driven steel-on-steel system was completed at a final cost of $10.9 million. Costing $280,000 annually to operate, the Huntsville Hospital Tram System handles approximately 2,200 passengers per day.

The vehicles were designed by the Gangloff company of Switzerland. Each car can handle three seated and 38 standing passengers. Additionally, each car was designed to accommodate the largest bed in use by the hospital for the transport of patients.

The system runs in an east-west direction between the main Huntsville Hospital building and the Huntsville Hospital for Women & Children with intermediate stops at the Plaza Resource Center and the Franklin Medical Tower. The system offers two separate modes for reaching the various stations, a Local Mode and an Express Mode. The Local Mode makes all four stops, primarily traveling along the northern track. The Express Mode only travels between the two termini, primarily along the southern track.

History
The idea of developing a tram system for Huntsville Hospital was initially proposed in mid-1997. 

By December 1998, plans for the system moved forward after gaining approval of several property variances from the Huntsville Board of Zoning Adjustment to allow for its construction. By early 2000 construction of the system would commence, with an initial opening slated for summer 2001. However, due to delays and the need for enhanced security along the system in the wake of the September 11 attacks, the system would not open until June 19, 2002.

By 2004, use of the tram resulted in the elimination of approximately 4,500 annual ambulance trips and the use of two full-time shuttle vans between the two main facilities. Due to this reduction in the number of vehicle trips made, Huntsville Hospital was awarded a 2004 Industrial Air Pollution Control Achievement Award from the city of Huntsville Air Pollution Control Board.

References

Transportation in Huntsville, Alabama
Hospital people mover systems
Hovair people movers
People mover systems in the United States